Morgan Technical Ceramics (MTC) is a business unit of Morgan Advanced Materials plc, part of its Carbon and Technical Ceramics division, and manufactures products from a comprehensive range of ceramic, glass, precious metal and dielectric materials. MTC has manufacturing locations in North America, Europe and Asia with each site having a strategic focus on a particular market. Its revenues were £237.3 million in 2021.

History
The company was founded in 1932 as Park Royal Porcelain Limited. It changed its name first in 1984 to Morgan Matroc Limited, then in 2002 to Morgan Advanced Ceramics Limited, and most recently in 2011 to its current name.

In 1964, Steatite & Porcelain Products Limited was acquired from Imperial Chemical Industries (ICI). This company, based in Stourport, had been established in 1907 and acquired by ICI in 1941.

Previously the company made electro-ceramic products such as piezoelectric components — this part of the business was sold to CeramTec in 2017.

References

External links
Morgan Technical Ceramics company website

Manufacturing companies established in 1932
Manufacturing companies of the United Kingdom
Companies based in Worcestershire
1932 establishments in England
Ceramics manufacturers of the United Kingdom
British companies established in 1932